Top-y-Fron Hall is a country house in the community of Connah's Quay, Wales. In 1977 it became a Grade II* listed building.

History 
The house dates from the 18th century and is an example of the earliest brick houses in Flintshire. The architecture is early Georgian era.

The house featured in 2016 in the Channel 4 series Obsessive Compulsive Cleaners.

See also
 Grade II* listed buildings in Flintshire

References 

Country houses in Wales
Grade II* listed buildings in Flintshire
Grade II* listed houses
Houses completed in the 18th century